Lamb's House is a historic A-listed building in Leith, a northern district of the City of Edinburgh, Scotland, which has served as both a place of residence and warehouse. The present house is an example of early-17th-century architecture typical of harbour towns around the North Sea.

The site was originally owned by Edinburgh merchant and shipowner Andrew Lamb. The Lamb family were reputed to have entertained Mary, Queen of Scots, somewhere nearby on her return from France in 1561. A contemporary record claims the young queen "remainit in Andro Lamb's hous be the space of an hour" while messages were sent to Edinburgh informing nobles of her return. In January 1581 he was the owner of the Mary Grace, which was sailing to Flanders with Montbirneau, a servant of Esmé Stewart. In November 1583 his passengers were an embassy to France led by Lord Seton with his son Alexander Seton and the architect William Schaw.

Lamb's House is situated at the corner of Burgess Street and Water Street. According to a report prepared by Headland Archaeology Ltd,

Lamb's House was a National Trust for Scotland property until it was sold to conservation architects for a sum believed to be around £1 million.

References 

Buildings and structures in Leith
Historic buildings and structures in the United Kingdom